Pat Olivieri (died 1970) was an American restaurateur. He is credited, along with his brother, Harry Olivieri, as the 1930 co-creator of the cheesesteak. The brothers opened Pat's King of Steaks in 1930, one of the best known purveyors of steak sandwiches in Philadelphia.

Olivieri died in 1970. His son Herbert Olivieri disputed ownership of the business with Harry Olivieri and his children. Harry's grandson Frank Jr. now runs the business.

See also
 History of Italian Americans in Philadelphia

References

External links
Harry Olivieri's obituary (Pittsburgh Post-Gazette). 
NPR segment with sound bite

American chefs
American male chefs
American people of Italian descent
Businesspeople from Philadelphia
1970 deaths
20th-century American businesspeople